Anton Marius Andersen (March 8, 1847 -  October 23, 1941) was an American Lutheran minister and the founding President of Trinity Seminary at Dana College.

Background
A. M. Andersen was born in Denmark, the son of Anders Jørgensen. He was one of seven children. After fulfilling his required military service, he became a pastor.

References

Additional Sources
Christensen, William E. Saga of the Tower: A History of Dana College and Trinity Seminary (Blair, Nebraska: Lutheran Publishing House, 1959)
Petersen, Peter L. A Place Called Dana: The Centennial History of Trinity Seminary and Dana College (Blair, Nebraska: Dana College, 1984)
Jensen, John M. The United Evangelical Lutheran Church: An Interpretation (Minneapolis: Augsburg Publishing House, 1964)
Nyholm, Paul C. The Americanization of the Danish Lutheran Churches in America: A Study in Immigrant History (Minneapolis: Augsburg, 1963)

External links
The Danish Immigrant Museum

1847 births
1941 deaths
20th-century American Lutheran clergy
Danish Lutheran clergy
Danish emigrants to the United States
Danish-American culture in Nebraska
Augsburg University alumni
Grand Crosses of the Order of the Dannebrog
People from Blair, Nebraska
People from Beresford, South Dakota